The 1970–71 season was Cardiff City F.C.'s 44th season in the Football League. They competed in the 22-team Division Two, then the second tier of English football, finishing third.

The club's season was disrupted by the sale of John Toshack to Liverpool in November, breaking up the Toshack-Brian Clark strike partnership which had scored countless goals for the club in recent years. Despite this the team reached the quarter-finals of the European Cup Winners Cup before losing 2–1 on aggregate to Spanish side Real Madrid, after winning the first leg 1–0 at their home ground Ninian Park, a result that has since gone on to become one of the most famous moments in the club's history.

Players

First team squad. 

 

|-
|GK||Jim Eadie||32||0||2||0||0||0||4||0||7||0||45||0||0||0||
|-
|GK||Frank Parsons||10||0||0||0||1||0||2||0||0||0||13||0||0||0||
|-
|DF||David Carver||42||1||2||0||1||0||6||0||7||0||58||1||0||0||
|-
|DF||Gary Bell||42||1||2||0||1||0||6||0||7||0||58||1||0||0||
|-
|DF||Steve Derrett||5(1)||1||0||0||0||0||0||0||1||1||6(1)||2||0||0||
|-
|DF||Brian Harris||25(1)||0||2||0||1||0||4(1)||0||2||0||0||0||0||0||
|-
|DF||Don Murray||42||1||2||0||1||0||6||0||7||1||58||2||0||0||
|-
|MF||Ian Gibson||40||6||1||0||1||0||6||2||6(1)||4||54(1)||12||0||0||
|-
|MF||Peter King||41||5||2||1||1||0||6||2||6(1)||2||56(1)||10||0||0||
|-
|MF||Leighton Phillips||29(1)||3||2||0||0||0||3(2)||1||7||0||41(3)||4||0||0||
|-
|MF||Mel Sutton||41||2||2||0||1||0||6||1||4||0||54||3||0||0||
|-
|MF||Bobby Woodruff||33(3)||3||2||0||1||0||6||1||6||1||48(3)||5||0||0||
|-
|FW||Ronnie Bird||3(2)||0||0||0||0(1)||0||0||0||4||1||7(3)||1||0||0||
|-
|FW||Brian Clark||33(2)||15||1(1)||0||1||0||5(1)||4||6||3||46(4)||22||0||0||
|-
|FW||John Parsons||1(2)||2||0||0||0||0||0||0||2(1)||2||3(3)||4||0||0||
|-
|FW||Nigel Rees||9||0||1(1)||0||0||0||2||0||2||1||14(1)||1||0||0||
|-
|FW||Derek Showers||1||0||0||0||0||0||0||0||0||0||1||0||0||0||
|-
|FW||John Toshack||16||8||0||0||1||0||4||5||0||0||21||13||0||0||
|-
|FW||Alan Warboys||17||13||1||0||0||0||0||0||3||0||21||13||0||0||
|}

League standings

Results by round

Fixtures & Results

Second Division

League Cup

FA Cup

European Cup Winners Cup

Welsh Cup

See also
Cardiff City F.C. seasons

Notes

References

Bibliography

*

Welsh Football Data Archive

Cardiff City F.C. seasons
Association football clubs 1970–71 season
Card